Requiem is the fourteenth studio album by American nu metal band Korn. The album was released on February 4, 2022 through Loma Vista and Concord. It was produced by the band and Chris Collier.

Background and recording 
The first hint at the release of a fourteenth studio album arose from a since-deleted interview with Kerrang!, in which it was stated that the album was fully written as of April 2021. The COVID-19 pandemic allowed for a surplus of time in which the album could be arranged, alleviating the harsh time constraints which would usually have been imposed. According to a press release:

 "It is an album born of time and the ability to create without pressure. Energized by a new creative process free of time constraints, the band was able to do things with Requiem that the past two decades haven't always afforded them, such as taking additional time to experiment together or diligently recording to analog tape – processes which unearthed newfound sonic dimension and texture in their music."

While bassist Reginald "Fieldy" Arvizu announced a hiatus later after this interview, it has been confirmed that his bass tracks will be used on this record.

Little to no new information regarding the album was released until early November, in which several cryptic hints toward the release of new material arose, the first of which involved several billboards involving the band's logo imposed on a background composed of gray static. The bottom-right corner of these billboards featured a QR code, which led to an Instagram filter featuring a 3D model in which a human hand can be seen tightly grasping an infant's head from the top. A close-up of this object is what is used for the album cover.

In addition, the band updated their "The Best of Korn" Spotify playlist with seven cryptic tracks, each spelling "Requiem" letter-by-letter.

Release and promotion 
On November 11, 2021, the cryptic teasers eventually culminated in the release of "Start the Healing", the first single released from the album. Alongside the release of this single, many details of the album also came: the cover, in which it is revealed that the baby's head is prominently featured, the track listing, with a total of nine tracks (the fewest across the band's studio discography) and revealing "Start the Healing" to be the third track, and the projected release date of the album being February 4, 2022. The album was made available to pre-order on the same day in several formats, notably including a limited-edition silver vinyl with a total of 1,000 copies.

On January 5, 2022, the band updated their website to show 6 versions of the album artwork, with the lyrics ¨Pulling away this veil I see...¨, and, when clicked on, took you to a video that was an audio track of drummer Ray Luzier tracking drums. Every day, culminating on January 11, they released a new instrumental, with guitars on January 6, bass on January 7, a solo guitar line on January 8, backing vocals on January 9, and then went a day without posting, before releasing the main vocals on January 11. The vocals being released also coincided with the band announcing the second single, "Forgotten", which was released on January 13. A third single, "Lost in the Grandeur", was released on February 2, 2022.

Reception

Critical reception

Requiem received positive reviews from music critics. At Metacritic, which assigns a normalised rating out of 100 to reviews from mainstream critics, the album has an average score of 77 out of 100 based on seven reviews, indicating "generally favorable reviews". AllMusic gave the album a positive review saying, "Against the odds, Korn have done it again with Requiem, a quick and ferocious blast that finds the band still hungry and innovative nearly 30 years into the game." Wall of Sound gave the album a score 7/10 and saying: "Requiem isn't going to end up listed among the great KoRn albums, but it's short, punchy and hooky. After more than 25 years I reckon that's OK for a band who are comfortable with what they do."

Accolades

Commercial performance 
Requiem debuted at number fourteen on the US Billboard 200 with 23,500 album-equivalent units, of which 20,000 were pure album sales. It is Korn's first album since 1994 to not peak Top-10. As of the end of 2022, the album has sold over 90,000 traditional copies in the US, and over 100,000 copies worldwide. In Australia the album peaked No. 1 for the first time since 2002. The album debuted worldwide in 31 total countries, debuting No. 1 in 7 countries, receiving phenomenal success Internationally.

"Start the Healing," the first single off the album peaked No. 1 on the Mediabase Active Rock chart on February 7th, 2022.

Track listing

Personnel 
Korn
 Jonathan Davis – vocals, production, recording production
 James "Munky" Shaffer – guitar, production, recording production
 Brian "Head" Welch – guitar, production, recording production
 Reginald "Fieldy" Arvizu – bass guitar, production, recording production
 Ray Luzier – drums, production, recording production

Additional personnel
 Chris Collier – production, recording production
 David Benveniste – executive production
 Vlado Meller – mastering
 Rich Costey – mixing
 James Harley – recording
 Jeremy Lubsey – mastering assistance
 Jeff Citron – mixing assistance
 Koby Berman – mixing assistance
 Johnson Tsang – sculpture, photography
 Christopher Leckie – design, art direction

Charts

Weekly charts

Year-end charts

References 

2022 albums
Korn albums
Loma Vista Recordings albums
Albums impacted by the COVID-19 pandemic